Joseph Behar (also credited as Joe Behar), (September 30, 1926 – June 26, 2021) was an American television director. He was known for directing the game show Let's Make a Deal, as well as the serials The Greatest Gift (producer and director), First Love, From These Roots,  Days of Our Lives, and General Hospital.

Primetime credits
 Dangerous Women
 Superior Court
 College Mad House
 Fun House
 Let's Make A Deal
 It's Anybody's Guess
 People Will Talk
 The Ernie Kovacs Show

Daytime credits
 Days of Our Lives - director (1965-1988)
 First Love (1954-1955)
 From These Roots - director (1958-1961)
 General Hospital - director (1996-2006)
 The Greatest Gift (1953-1954)
 The Young and the Restless

Awards and nominations
Daytime Emmy Award
Win, 2000, 2004–2006, Directing Team, General Hospital
Nomination, 1996–1999, 2001, Directing Team, General Hospital
Win, 1990, Directing Team, Fun House
Nomination, 1975, 1977, 1979, 1985–1988, Directing Team, Days of our Lives
Nomination, 1988, Directing Team, Superior Court

Directors Guild of America Award
Nomination, 1996, 1999 ("The Bacchanalia" Episode # 2580), 2005, Directing, General Hospital
Win, 1962, Directing, Ernie Kovacs Show

References

External links
 

1926 births
2021 deaths
American television directors